Bhutan Telecom is a telecommunications and Internet service provider in the Kingdom of Bhutan. It is the sole fixed-line telephony provider in the country. It also operates the B-Mobile mobile service and the DrukNet Internet service.

History

Bhutan Telecom was established on 1 July 2000.

B-Mobile
B-Mobile provides service in all 205 Gewogs (Blocks) in Bhutan. It operates on 900/1800 MHz GSM/GPRS/EDGE, 850 MHz UMTS/HSDPA and 1800 MHz LTE frequencies.

LTE 4G was first launched in Thimphu on 24 October 2013. 4G service operates in 1800 MHz - band 3 (FDD).

See also
Telecommunications in Bhutan

References 

Communications in Bhutan
Internet in Bhutan
2000 establishments in Bhutan